Rosemary E. Bradshaw is a New Zealand mycologist, as of 2019 full professor of genetics at the Massey University.

Academic career

After a 1983 PhD titled  'Hybridization of Aspergillus species'  at the University of Nottingham, Bradshaw moved to the Massey University, rising to full professor in 2016.

Bradshaw's best-known work involved the identification of the oomycete Phytophthora agathadicida as the cause of Kauri dieback.

Selected works 
 Ohm, Robin A., Nicolas Feau, Bernard Henrissat, Conrad L. Schoch, Benjamin A. Horwitz, Kerrie W. Barry, Bradford J. Condon et al. "Diverse lifestyles and strategies of plant pathogenesis encoded in the genomes of eighteen Dothideomycetes fungi." PLoS Pathogens 8, no. 12 (2012): e1003037.
 De Wit, Pierre JGM, Ate Van Der Burgt, Bilal Ökmen, Ioannis Stergiopoulos, Kamel A. Abd-Elsalam, Andrea L. Aerts, Ali H. Bahkali et al. "The genomes of the fungal plant pathogens Cladosporium fulvum and Dothistroma septosporum reveal adaptation to different hosts and lifestyles but also signatures of common ancestry." PLoS genetics 8, no. 11 (2012): e1003088.
 Groenewald, Marizeth, Irene Barnes, Rosie E. Bradshaw, Anna V. Brown, Angie Dale, Johannes Z. Groenewald, Kathy J. Lewis, Brenda D. Wingfield, Michael J. Wingfield, and Pedro W. Crous. "Characterization and distribution of mating type genes in the Dothistroma needle blight pathogens." Phytopathology 97, no. 7 (2007): 825–834.
 Bradshaw, Rosie E., Deepak Bhatnagar, Rebecca J. Ganley, Carmel J. Gillman, Brendon J. Monahan, and Janet M. Seconi. "Dothistroma pini, a forest pathogen, contains homologs of aflatoxin biosynthetic pathway genes." Appl. Environ. Microbiol. 68, no. 6 (2002): 2885–2892.

References

External links
  
 

Living people
New Zealand women academics
Year of birth missing (living people)
Alumni of the University of Nottingham
Academic staff of the Massey University
New Zealand mycologists
Women mycologists
New Zealand women writers